Dieter Wellershoff (16 March 1933 – 16 July 2005) was a German admiral and Chief of Federal Armed Forces Staff from 1986 until 1991.

External links
Biography on BMVg website

1933 births
2005 deaths
Admirals of the German Navy
Inspectors General of the Bundeswehr
Grand Crosses with Star and Sash of the Order of Merit of the Federal Republic of Germany
Chiefs of Navy (Germany)
Commandants of the Bundeswehr Command and Staff College